Kiran KC() is a Nepalese actor and comedian.

KC started as theatre artist along with Maha Jodi, from Rastriya Naach Ghar. He later became a television actor and became a prominent comedy actor in sitcoms such as Jire Khursani.

KC was a producer on the feature film Shatru Gate.

Filmography 
KC has acted in several telefilms and about 50 feature films.

Awards 
National Film Awards 2005 (2062 BS) - Best Comedy Actor for Meri Aama
Gorakha Dakshin Bahu 4th (2062 BS)

References

21st-century Nepalese male actors

Year of birth missing (living people)
Living people
Place of birth missing (living people)
Nepalese comedians
Nepalese film producers
Nepalese male comedians
Nepalese television actors